Renubala Pradhan is an Indian politician from the Biju Janata Dal party. She is a Member of the Parliament of India representing Orissa in the Rajya Sabha, the upper house of the Indian Parliament.

References

External links
Profile on Rajya Sabha website
 Profile at PRSIndia

1964 births
Living people
Biju Janata Dal politicians
Rajya Sabha members from Odisha
People from Ganjam district
Women in Odisha politics
21st-century Indian women politicians
21st-century Indian politicians
Women members of the Rajya Sabha